Eutreta xanthochaeta is a species of tephritid or fruit flies in the genus Eutreta of the family Tephritidae. It induces galls on Lantana camara.

Distribution
Mexico, Guatemala, El Salvador. Introduced to Hawaii, Australia.

References

Tephritinae
Insects described in 1923
Diptera of North America
Diptera of South America